Wyoming Tornado is a 1929 American silent Western film directed by J.P. McGowan and starring Art Acord, Peggy Montgomery and Slim Whitaker.

Cast
 Art Acord
 Peggy Montgomery
 J.P. McGowan 
 Slim Whitaker 
 Bud Osborne  
 John Lowell

References

Bibliography
 Munden, Kenneth White. The American Film Institute Catalog of Motion Pictures Produced in the United States, Part 1. University of California Press, 1997.

External links
 

1929 films
1929 Western (genre) films
1920s English-language films
American black-and-white films
Films directed by J. P. McGowan
Silent American Western (genre) films
1920s American films